The powers that be is a phrase that refers to those individuals or groups who collectively hold authority over a particular domain

The powers that be may also refer to:

Literature 
 The Powers That Be (book), a 1979 book by David Halberstam
 Powers That Be, first book in the Petaybee Series by Anne McCaffrey and Elizabeth Ann Scarborough
 Powers That Be, an American comic book series published by Broadway Comics
 "The Powers that Be", overruling entities in Diane Duane's Young Wizards series
"The Powers that Be" was the original title of "The Stone of Threbe", eleventh episode of W.I.T.C.H

Music 
 "The Powers That Be", a song by Roger Waters on the album Radio K.A.O.S.
 "Powers That Be", a song by Hate Eternal on King of All Kings (Hate Eternal album)
 The Powers That B, a 2015 album by Death Grips
 "Powers That Be" (Rick Ross song)
 "Powers That Be", a song by Hieroglyphics on Full Circle

Television 
 The Powers That Be (Charmed), characters in the television series Charmed, also known as The Elders
 The Powers That Be (Angel), characters in the TV series Angel
 "The Powers That Be" (Jackie Chan Adventures), an episode of the animated show Jackie Chan Adventures
 "The Powers That Be" (Stargate SG-1), an episode of the TV series Stargate SG-1
 "PTB" (The Pretender), an episode of the television series The Pretender
 The Powers That Be (TV series), a situation comedy
 "The Powers That Be", characters in professional wrestling series WCW Monday Nitro in late 1999